The secretary of state of Nebraska is one of the constitutional officers of the U.S. state of Nebraska. In Nebraska, the secretary of state is elected for a four-year term. Vacancies are filled by appointment by the governor of Nebraska.

The current officeholder is Bob Evnen, who took office in 2019.

Organization
The secretary of state's office is composed of four divisions:

The Business Services Division registers corporations, limited liability companies, limited partnerships, limited liability partnerships, trade names and trademarks.  This division is also responsible for filing liens under the Uniform Commercial Code, licensing notaries public, and administering Nebraska's address confidentiality program.
The Elections Division administers elections, including the implementation of the Help America Vote Act.
The Records Management Division is responsible for storing state government records, converting them into different formats when necessary, and creates and administers records retention policies.
The Licensing Division oversees the licensing of collection agencies, debt management agencies, private detectives, and polygraph and voice stress examiners.

Additional duties
The Nebraska secretary of state is the keeper of the Great Seal of the State of Nebraska, and the state's main advisor on youth civics education.  The secretary is also in charge of filing, certifying, and distributing state agency rules and regulations which are to become part of the Nebraska Administrative Code.  The secretary is the state's "chief protocol officer", with the duty of promoting commerce, cultural exchange and educational studies between Nebraska and foreign nations.

Boards and commissions
The Nebraska secretary of state holds ex officio these posts of the following boards and commissions:
 Chairperson of the Nebraska State Records Board, which oversees electronic access to state government information and advises on the implementation of the Records Management Act.
 Chairperson of the Nebraska Real Estate Commission, which licenses real estate brokers and agents and investigates complaints against licensees.
 Chairperson of the Nebraska Collection Agency Licensing Board, which is responsible for licensing collection agencies.
 Secretary of the Nebraska Board of Pardons, which considers applications for pardons of criminal convictions and commutations of sentences.
 Secretary of the Board of State Canvassers, which certifies results following each statewide election.
 Member of the Nebraska Accountability and Disclosure Commission, which administers and enforces state laws regarding ethics, campaign finance and lobbying.

List of secretaries of the Territory of Nebraska

List of secretaries of the State of Nebraska
Parties

Notes

See also
 List of company registers

References

External links
Duties of the Nebraska Secretary of State